Doo-Bop is the last studio album by American jazz trumpeter Miles Davis. It was recorded with hip hop producer Easy Mo Bee and released posthumously on June 30, 1992, by Warner Bros. Records. The album was received unfavorably by most critics, although it won a Grammy Award for Best R&B Instrumental Performance the following year.

Background 
The project stemmed from Davis sitting in his New York City apartment in the summer with the windows open, listening to the sound of the streets. He wanted to record an album of music that captured these sounds. In early 1991, Davis called up his friend Russell Simmons and asked him to find some young producers who could help create this kind of music, leading to Davis's collaboration with Easy Mo Bee.

At the time of Davis's death in 1991, only six pieces for the album had been completed. Easy Mo Bee was asked by Warner Bros. to take some of the unreleased trumpet performances (stemming from the unreleased 1985 album Rubberband, which was later released as an album in 2019), and build tracks that Davis "would have loved" around the recordings. The album's posthumous tracks (as stated in the liner notes) are "High Speed Chase" and "Fantasy". A reprise of the song "Mystery" rounded out the album's nine-track length.

Release and reception 

The title is a play on words on the two musical genres Doo-Wop and Be-Bop. Doo-Bop was released by Warner Bros. Records on June 30, 1992. By May 1993, it had sold approximately 300,000 copies worldwide. The album received negative reviews from most critics. Greg Tate called it an "inconsequential" jazz-rap record from Davis, while Billboard found the R&B-based album to not be "quite cut as deeply" as his 1970s funk recordings. In Entertainment Weekly, Greg Sandow wrote that Davis's solos were performed with "impeccable logic and wistful finesse" but accompanied by hackneyed guest raps and unadventurous hip hop beats, which reduced Doo-Bop to "elegant aural wallpaper". Los Angeles Times critic Don Snowden believed the album "succeeded only in fits and starts" because of Davis's first time working with hip hop tracks, "the rigidity" of which Snowden felt often reduced his "muted-laced-with-echo trumpet to just another instrumental color in the mix". Richard Williams from The Independent viewed the tracks as a regression from the ambient-inflected Tutu (1986) album as they inspired trumpet improvisations from Davis which displayed "a rhythmic banality that was never remotely discernible in Miles's pre-electric playing".

In a positive review, Q called Doo-Bop "a collector's piece ... as hip, sexy, open and complex as the best of his work since he elected to turn to FM airplay music in the 1980s". Musician considered it a pleasant hip hop album and an accessible introduction to Davis's music for "younger ears weaned on modern beats". In DownBeat, Robin Tolleson wrote that Davis sounded less timid than on previous few records as "his phrasing and concept adapt sharply from tune to tune". Doo-Bop won the 1993 Grammy Award for Best R&B Instrumental Performance.

Track listing 

All tracks written by Miles Davis/Easy Mo Bee, except where indicated:

Personnel
Credits are adapted from The Last Miles (2007) by George Cole.
Musicians
 Miles Davis – trumpet
 Deron Johnson – keyboards
 J.R – performer
 A.B. Money – performer

Production
 Easy Mo Bee – producer
 Matt Pierson – associate producer
 Gordon Meltzer – associate executive producer

 Daniel Beroff – engineer
 Reginald Dozier – engineer
 Zane Giles – engineer
 Randy Hall – engineer
 John McGlain – engineer
 Bruce Moore – engineer
 Arthur Steuer – engineer
 Kirk Yano – engineer
 D'Anthony Johnson – engineer, mixing
 Eric Lynch – engineer, mixing
 Ted Jensen – mastering

 Rodney Lucas – technical Services
 Faith Newman – production services
 Linda Burke – production services
 Robin Lynch – art direction
 Annie Leibovitz – photography
 Michael Benabib – photography

Charts

Certifications and sales

References

Further reading

External links 
 

1992 albums
Jazz rap albums
Miles Davis albums
Albums produced by Easy Mo Bee
Warner Records albums
Albums published posthumously
Hip hop albums by American artists